Talbot Mundy: Messenger of Destiny is a collection of memoirs about Talbot Mundy compiled by Donald M. Grant.  The book includes a bibliography of Mundy's works.  It was released in 1983 by Donald M. Grant, Publisher, Inc. in an edition of 1,475 copies.

Contents
 Introduction, by Donald M. Grant
 "Autobiography", by Talbot Mundy
 "Willie—Rogue and Rebel", by Peter Berresford Ellis
 "Talbot Mundy", by Dawn Mundy Provost
 "Ghosts Walk...", by Darrel Crombie
 "Talbot Mundy in Adventure", by Donald M. Grant
 "The Glory of Tros", by Fritz Leiber
 "Books"
 "Magazine Appearances"
 "The Jerusalem News"
 "The Theosophical Path"
 "The New York Times"

References

1983 non-fiction books
Biographies about writers
Donald M. Grant, Publisher books